Quincy Jyrome Acy (born October 6, 1990) is an American former professional basketball player who last played for Olympiacos of the Greek Basket League and the EuroLeague. He currently works as a player development coach for the Texas Legends of the NBA G League. He played college basketball for Baylor University.

High school career
Acy attended John Horn High School in Mesquite, Texas. As a senior in 2007–08, he averaged 17.8 points and 7.8 rebounds per game. Considered a four-star recruit by Rivals.com, Acy was listed as the No. 25 power forward and the No. 84 player in the nation in 2008.

College career
As a freshman at Baylor in 2008–09, Acy earned Big 12 All-Freshman team honors from the media and was named Big 12 Co-Rookie of the Week on November 24, 2008. He ranked sixth on the team in scoring (5.4) and fourth in rebounding (3.6), while leading Bears in blocked shots (34). He set Big 12 and Baylor records with 20 consecutive field goals made—he made his first 20 field goals of his career, starting on November 15 and ending on November 24.

As a sophomore in 2009–10, Acy averaged 9.3 points and 5.1 rebounds per game as Baylor's sixth man. He was subsequently named to the Big 12 All-Reserve team by the media.

As a junior in 2010–11, Acy averaged 12.4 points and 7.6 rebounds per game. In the first round of the Big 12 men's basketball tournament, Acy recorded a team-high 21 points and a career-high 15 rebounds in a loss to Oklahoma. Following the season, he earned the Big 12 Sixth Man Award and was named All-Big 12 Honorable Mention.

As a senior in 2011–12, Acy averaged 12.0 points and 7.4 rebounds per game. Following the season, he was named to the All-Big 12 second team and the Big 12 All-Defensive team.

Professional career

Toronto Raptors (2012–2013)
On June 29, 2012, Acy was selected by the Toronto Raptors with the 37th overall pick in the 2012 NBA draft. On July 16, 2012, he signed a multi-year contract with the Raptors. He played sparingly for Toronto in 2012–13 and earned two assignments to the NBA Development League, where he played for the Bakersfield Jam. On April 6, 2013, Acy scored a season-high 13 points in the Raptors' 100–83 loss to the Milwaukee Bucks.

Sacramento Kings (2013–2014)
On December 9, 2013, Acy was traded, along Rudy Gay and Aaron Gray, to the Sacramento Kings in exchange for Greivis Vásquez, Patrick Patterson, John Salmons and Chuck Hayes. Six days later, he made his debut for the Kings in a 106–91 win over the Houston Rockets, recording four points, three rebounds and one block in 13 minutes off the bench.

New York Knicks (2014–2015)
On August 6, 2014, Acy was traded, along with Travis Outlaw, to the New York Knicks in exchange for Wayne Ellington and Jeremy Tyler. He made his debut for the Knicks in their season opener on October 29, 2014, recording six points, six rebounds, one assist and one block in 21 minutes off the bench in a 104–80 loss to the Chicago Bulls. On January 5, 2015, he recorded career highs of 19 points and 14 rebounds in a 105–83 loss to the Memphis Grizzlies. He had a career-best season in 2014–15, averaging career highs in points (5.9), rebounds (4.4), assists (1.0), minutes (18.9) and games played (68).

Return to Sacramento (2015–2016)
On July 22, 2015, Acy signed with the Sacramento Kings, returning to the franchise for a second stint. On January 7, 2016, he scored a season-high 18 points in a 118–115 win over the Los Angeles Lakers.

Dallas Mavericks (2016)
On July 20, 2016, Acy signed with his home team, the Dallas Mavericks. On November 18, 2016, he was waived by the Mavericks after appearing in six games.

Texas Legends (2016–2017) 
On November 28, 2016, Acy was acquired by the Los Angeles D-Fenders of the NBA Development League and then immediately traded to the Texas Legends, the Mavericks' D-League affiliate. On December 1, 2016, he made his debut for the Legends in a 121–106 win over the Greensboro Swarm, recording 16 points, seven rebounds and two blocks in 17 minutes as a starter. In 12 games for the Legends, he averaged 17.3 points, 8.1 rebounds, 1.2 assists, 1.6 steals and 2.1 blocks in 31.9 minutes.

Brooklyn Nets (2017–2018)
On January 10, 2017, Acy signed a 10-day contract with the Brooklyn Nets. He went on to sign a second 10-day contract on January 20, and a multi-year contract on January 30. On March 3, 2017, he scored a season-high 18 points in a 112–97 loss to the Utah Jazz. On April 7, 2018, Acy had career highs with six 3-pointers and 21 points in a 124–96 win over the Chicago Bulls.

Phoenix Suns (2019)
On January 7, 2019, Acy signed a 10-day contract with the Phoenix Suns. On January 17, he signed a second 10-day contract with the Suns. On January 25, Acy recorded a season-high 10 rebounds in a blowout loss to the Denver Nuggets. Two days later, Quincy left the Phoenix Suns after his second 10-day contract expired.

Return to Texas (2019)
On February 24, 2019, the Texas Legends announced that Acy had returned to their team.

Shenzhen Leopards (2019)
On March 15, 2019, Acy agreed to a deal with the Shenzhen Leopards. On March 24, 2019, Acy was registered for the season, replacing Dwight Buycks. On March 26, 2019, after appearing in one game for Shenzhen, Acy was replaced by Dwight Buycks.

Maccabi Tel Aviv (2019–2020)
On July 31, 2019, Acy signed with Maccabi Tel Aviv of the Israeli Premier League and the EuroLeague, signing a one-year deal with an option for another one. On November 16, 2019, Acy recorded a new career-high 22 points, shooting 9-of-12 from the field, along with six rebounds and six dunks in a 94–57 win over Maccabi Ashdod.

Olympiacos (2021–2022)
On November 3, 2021, Acy signed with Olympiacos of the Greek Basket League and the EuroLeague.

NBA career statistics

Regular season

|-
| style="text-align:left;"| 
| style="text-align:left;"| Toronto
| 29 || 0 || 11.8 || .560 || .500 || .816 || 2.7 || .4 || .4 || .5 || 4.0
|-
| style="text-align:left;"| 
| style="text-align:left;"| Toronto
| 7 || 0 || 8.7 || .429 || .400 || .625 || 2.1 || .6|| .6 || .4 || 2.7
|-
| style="text-align:left;"| 
| style="text-align:left;"| Sacramento
| 56 || 0 || 14.0 || .472 || .200 || .667 || 3.6 || .4 || .3 || .4 || 2.7
|-
| style="text-align:left;"| 
| style="text-align:left;"| New York
| 68 || 22 || 18.9 || .459 || .300 || .784 || 4.4 || 1.0 || .4 || .3 || 5.9
|-
| style="text-align:left;"| 
| style="text-align:left;"| Sacramento
| 59 || 29 || 14.8 || .556 || .388 || .735 || 3.2 || .5 || .5 || .4 || 5.2
|-
| style="text-align:left;"| 
| style="text-align:left;"| Dallas
| 6 || 0 || 8.0 || .294 || .125 || .667 || 1.3 || .0 || .0 || .0 || 2.2
|-
| style="text-align:left;"| 
| style="text-align:left;"| Brooklyn
| 32 || 1 || 15.9 || .425 || .434 || .754 || 3.3 || .6 || .4 || .5 || 6.5
|-
| style="text-align:left;"| 
| style="text-align:left;"| Brooklyn
| 70 || 8 || 19.4 || .356 || .349 || .817 || 3.7 || .8 || .5 || .4 || 5.9
|- 
| style="text-align:left;"| 
| style="text-align:left;"| Phoenix
| 10 || 0 || 12.3 || .222 || .133 || .700 || 2.5 || .8 || .1 || .4 || 1.7
|- class="sortbottom"
| style="text-align:center;" colspan="2"| Career
| 337 || 60 || 16.0 || .444 || .350 || .759 || 3.5 || .6 || .4 || .4 || 4.9

References

External links
 

Baylor Bears bio 

1990 births
Living people
21st-century African-American sportspeople
African-American basketball players
American expatriate basketball people in Canada
American expatriate basketball people in China
American expatriate basketball people in Greece
American expatriate basketball people in Israel
American men's basketball players
Bakersfield Jam players
Basketball players from Texas
Baylor Bears men's basketball players
Brooklyn Nets players
Centers (basketball)
Dallas Mavericks players
John Horn High School alumni
Maccabi Tel Aviv B.C. players
New York Knicks players
Olympiacos B.C. players
People from Mesquite, Texas
Phoenix Suns players
Power forwards (basketball)
Sacramento Kings players
Shenzhen Leopards players
Sportspeople from the Dallas–Fort Worth metroplex
Sportspeople from Tyler, Texas
Texas Legends players
Toronto Raptors draft picks
Toronto Raptors players